Teepee Creek is a hamlet in northwest Alberta, Canada within the County of Grande Prairie No. 1.  It is located north of Bezanson and east of Sexsmith, at the intersection of Highway 674 and Highway 733.

The hamlet is located in census division No. 19 and in the federal riding of Peace River.

It was a farming and ranching community that became an oil and gas based economy during the 1980s.

Demographics 
Teepee Creek recorded a population of 25 in the 1981 Census of Population conducted by Statistics Canada.

Amenities 
As of 2006, the community had Teepee Creek School, community hall, fire hall and arena.

Attractions 
Teepee Creek is known to most people for its stampede.  In the 1960s the stampede was the most popular rodeo in northern Alberta. The first stampede was held in 1917.

See also 
List of communities in Alberta
List of hamlets in Alberta

References

External links 
Discover the Peace Country - Teepee Creek
   Teepee Creek Stampede

County of Grande Prairie No. 1
Hamlets in Alberta